Jerseyville is the largest city in and the county seat of Jersey County, Illinois, United States.  At the 2020 census, the city had a total population of 8,337.

Jerseyville is a part of Southern Illinois, the Metro-East region and the St. Louis Metropolitan Statistical Area.

History
In 1827, James Faulkner, a Pennsylvania native, and his family built a small framed structure that was named the "Little Red House," in the area that is now known as Jerseyville. The "Little Red House" served as the first stagecoach station, first tavern, first school, and first bank in the immediate area. By 1834, the small settlement that grew up around Faulkner's home, then known as Hickory Grove by its residents, was surveyed and platted by two immigrants from New Jersey, John Lott and Edward M. Daly. Lott and Daly's involvement marked the beginning of a proportionally large number of merchants, businessmen and settlers from New Jersey. A meeting was called in that same year at the "Little Red House" to vote for a town name, so a post office could be established. The name of Jerseyville was chosen to honor the native state of many of its inhabitants.

In 1839, Jersey County was formed out of Greene County and Jerseyville was named as its county seat. After the American Civil War ended, and the construction of the Alton & Chicago Railroad was completed, Jerseyville saw a period of commercial, industrial and urban growth. The first major period of growth in the city occurred from 1880 to 1916, and from that time to the present, Jerseyville's growth has since been steady and substantial. The majority of the commercial structures that are now located in the Downtown Historic District and Courthouse Square were built during the late 19th and early 20th centuries. It was also during this time that the present Jersey County Courthouse was built. The two-story,  Romanesque Revival building was completed in 1893, and is considered to be one of the most aesthetic courthouses in the area. Other nearby Victorian style buildings in the city include Queen Anne, Edwardian and Italianate architectural features, with several of these buildings having been recently renovated.

From 1912 to 1918, Jerseyville was the terminus of an interurban electric passenger railroad from Alton which was the stub of a project by the Alton, Jacksonville and Peoria Railway for a line to Peoria.

In recent decades, Jerseyville has been a testing ground in the agricultural biotechnology field. Bayer (formerly Monsanto) owns and operates a facility located just south of the city, which in 1987, was the site of the world's very first biotechnology field trial – first with tomatoes and later that year with soybeans. The facility was also home to the first triple stacked corn trial in 1998, which later became a part of one of Monsanto's top-selling products. The facility was further expanded in 2008, and now consists of sixteen greenhouses and almost  of land for field testing.

The Downtown Historic District is presently home to some antique stores and gift shops, some clothing and shoe stores, a pharmacy, public library, post office, and several local restaurants and banks. Most of the growth that has occurred since the early 1990s has been in the southern and southwestern portions of the city, where new residential subdivisions and retail shopping centers have been built, and where numerous land annexations have been made by the city.

Geography
Jerseyville is located at  (39.120789, -90.327545).

Climate
Typically, the city's climate reflects most Midwest cities, located in the transitional zone between the humid continental climate type and the humid subtropical climate type (Köppen Dfa and Cfa, respectively), with neither large mountains nor large bodies of water to moderate its temperature. Spring is the wettest season and produces severe weather ranging from tornadoes to snow or ice storms. Summers are hot and humid, and the humidity often makes the heat index rise to temperatures feeling well above . Fall is mild with lower humidity and can produce intermittent bouts of heavy rainfall with the first snow flurries usually forming in late November. Winters can be cold at times with periodic light snow and temperatures below freezing.

Demographics

As of the census of 2000, there were 7,984 people, 3,260 households, and 2,089 families residing in the city. The racial makeup of the city was 98.85% White, 0.09% African American, 0.18% Native American, 0.16% Asian, 0.10% from other races, and 0.63% from two or more races. Hispanic or Latino of any race were 0.54% of the population.

There were 3,260 households, out of which 31.5% had children under the age of 18 living with them, 49.1% were married couples living together, 12.1% had a female householder with no husband present, and 35.9% were non-families. 32.1% of all households were made up of individuals, and 17.7% had someone living alone who was 65 years of age or older.  The average household size was 2.35, and the average family size was 2.97.

In the city, the population was spread out, with 24.4% under the age of 18, 8.1% from 18 to 24, 27.2% from 25 to 44, 19.9% from 45 to 64, and 20.4% who were 65 years of age or older.  The median age was 38 years. For every 100 females, there were 84.6 males.  For every 100 females age 18 and over, there were 80.5 males.

The median income for a household in the city was $35,556, and the median income for a family was $46,832. Males had a median income of $37,312 versus $21,282 for females. The per capita income for the city was $20,178.  About 5.8% of families and 7.3% of the population were below the poverty line, including 8.5% of those under age 18 and 4.7% of those age 65 or over.

Culture

National Register of Historic Places

Jerseyville has five places and sites that are listed on the National Register of Historic Places. The Jersey County Courthouse and the Jerseyville Downtown Historic District were added in 1986. The Col. William H. Fulkerson Farmstead was added to the Register in 1998, and the Fisher-Chapman Farmstead was added in 2012. The Jerseyville First Presbyterian Church was added to the Register in 2021.

Media

Print / Online:
Daily newspaper: The Telegraph - published out of Alton, but also covers the Jerseyville and Jersey County areas
Weekly newspaper: The Jersey County Journal - distributed every Thursday and available online
Weekly classifieds: The Jersey County Advantage - print only

Radio:
WJBM 1480 kHz AM / 104.7 mHz FM - has a talk radio / country music format
KXI70 162.450 mHz - NOAA Weather Radio
Jerseyville is also served by most stations in the St. Louis area market.

Recreation
The Jerseyville Parks and Recreation Department maintains and operates seven parks:

Blackorby Athletic Field - Franklin Ave.
Dolan Park - June and Spruce St.
Lions Club Park - Jefferson and Spruce St.
Northmoor Park - Liberty St.
Rotary Club Centennial Park - Liberty, Prairie, and Carpenter St. (Illinois Route 16)
Wittman Park - Jefferson St.
Wock Family Lake - June St. and Fidelity Rd.

The Donald W. Snyders Community Sports Complex is located on the southern side of the city on County Road, east of Jersey Community Middle School. The complex is made up of two baseball fields, two softball fields, one football field, outdoor oval track, and a concession stand. The complex, which is maintained by Jersey Community Unit School District 100, replaced the previous oval track and football field at Jersey Community High School, as the building was built on top of the field in 2005.

Government
Jerseyville uses a city commission form of government, consisting of four commissioners and one mayor. The city's current mayor is William Russell.

Education
Jerseyville has a number of public and private schools. Public schools are part of Jersey Community Unit School District 100.

 Elementary schools
 East Elementary School (Grades 3 through 5)
 West Elementary School (Grades Pre-K through 2)
 Holy Ghost School (Grades Pre-K through 4)

 Middle schools
 Jersey Community Middle School (Grades 5 through 7)
 St. Francis Xavier School (Grades 5 through 8)

 High school
Jersey Community High School (Grades 8th through 12th)

Both Holy Ghost and St. Francis Xavier Schools are private Roman Catholic schools.

Schools in Jerseyville had a total combined enrollment of 2,720 students.

Nearby colleges and universities include Principia College, in Elsah, and Lewis and Clark Community College, in Godfrey.

Religious organizations 
Jerseyville is home to a number of religious organizations, consisting of both small and large congregations.

Churches that serve Jerseyville are listed here in alphabetical order:

Church of the Nazarene
Eastland Baptist Church
Faith Temple Pentecostal Church
First Assembly of God
First Baptist Church
First Church of Christ, Scientist
First Presbyterian Church
Gospel Assembly Church
Grace Community Baptist Church
Holy Ghost Church
Hope Lutheran Church
Jerseyville Church of Christ
Jerseyville Methodist Church
Kingdom Increase Church
LifechurchX
Open Door House of Praise
Peace United Church of Christ
St. Francis Xavier Catholic Church
Victory Baptist Church

Infrastructure

Transportation
Two major highways run through the city. US Highway 67 runs along a north–south route, while Illinois Route 16 runs along a west–east route. Also, Illinois Route 109 has its northern terminus in Jerseyville at US Highway 67.

A four-lane expansion of US Highway 67 in Jerseyville has been in the planning stages for years, and is currently in Illinois' five-year road construction plan. The plan includes the Jerseyville Bypass, which is expected to go around the eastern portion of the city when it is completed. Construction of the bypass has not started yet, but all of the work prior to actual road construction was scheduled to be completed by 2012. In nearby Delhi, an extension of the expressway was opened up to traffic in 2021. This is a part of the completion of the entire US Highway 67 four-lane project in Illinois between Godfrey and the Quad Cities area.

Utilities
Utility companies serving Jerseyville are Ameren (natural gas and electricity), Grafton Technologies and Frontier Communications (landline telephone service and internet), and Sparklight (cable television). Water and sewer services are provided and maintained by Illinois American Water.

Notable people

 Kathie Conway, member of the Missouri House of Representatives
 Hugh W. Cross, (1896-1972) former Illinois Lieutenant Governor and member of the Illinois House of Representatives
 Russell E. Dunham, (1920-2009) World War II veteran and recipient of the Medal of Honor. He resided in Jerseyville.

 Brent Hawkins, former football player for the Saskatchewan Roughriders of the CFL, and for the Jacksonville Jaguars of the NFL
 Arthur Scott King, (1876–1957) noted physicist and astrophysicist
 Anthony L. Knapp, (1828–1881) US congressman and Illinois senator
 Robert M. Knapp, (1831–1889) US congressman and former mayor of Jerseyville
 Stan McGarvey, former NCAA Division II head football coach.
 Thomas J. Selby, (1840–1917) congressman and former mayor of Jerseyville
 Jim Watson, former member of the Illinois House of Representatives

Underground Railroad

Jerseyville was also a minor stopping point on the historic Underground Railroad before and during the Civil War. The "Little Red House" and a few other residences were utilized as stations for the Underground Railroad until the end of the Civil War, with some residences having false cellars that were used to hide slaves searching for freedom.

See also
Jersey Community Hospital
Oak Grove Cemetery (Jerseyville, Illinois)

References

Further reading
 Marshall M. Cooper, History of Jerseyville, Illinois, Brookhaven Press, 2001. 
 Robbi Courtaway, Spirits of St. Louis II: Further Hauntings in the Mound City, Virginia Publishing, 2002. 
 National Academy of Sciences Staff, Biographical Memoirs, National Academies Press, 1996.

External links

City of Jerseyville

 
Metro East
Cities in Illinois
Cities in Jersey County, Illinois
County seats in Illinois
Populated places established in 1827
Populated places on the Underground Railroad
1827 establishments in Illinois